PCI IDE ISA Xcelerator (PIIX), also known as Intel 82371, is a family of Intel southbridge microchips employed in some Intel chipsets. x86 virtualization implementations often support emulations of various PIIX-based chipsets.

Versions

PIIX
The PIIX integrated an IDE controller with two 8237 DMA controllers, the 8254 PIT, and two 8259 PICs and a PCI to ISA bus bridge. It was introduced with the 430FX Triton chipset in 1995. The mobile version was introduced with the 430MX mobile Triton chipset.

The following variations existed:
82371FB (PIIX)
82371MX (MPIIX) Mobile

PIIX3
The PIIX3 introduced a USB 1.0 controller and support for an external I/O APIC. It was used with the 430HX and 430VX Triton II and 440FX northbridges.

The following variations existed:
82371SB (PIIX3)

PIIX4
The PIIX4 introduced ACPI support, an improved IDE controller with Ultra DMA/33 or ATA-4 support and an integrated a MC146818 style RTC and CMOS controller. It was used with the 430TX and the 440LX Balboa northbridges. The PIIX4E updated the ACPI support. It was mainly used in 440BX and 440GX chipsets but 440EX, 440ZX, and 450NX chipsets also employed it. The mobile version was used in 440BX and 440ZX-M chipsets.

The following variations existed:
82371AB (PIIX4) Base
82371EB (PIIX4E) Enhanced
82371MB (PIIX4M) Mobile

PIIX5
This seems to be a reference to the Itanium 460GX I/O and Firmware Bridge (IFB) chipset component which has been referred to as 82372FB (PIIX5), 82468FB, and finally FW82468GX (IFB).

See also
List of Intel chipsets
Platform Controller Hub (PCH)
System Controller Hub (SCH)
I/O Controller Hub (ICH)
Super I/O 
Northbridge (computing)
Southbridge (computing)

References 

Intel products
Intel chipsets